Medulla Oblongata is a 2014 Indian Malayalam-language film produced by S. Madhan and directed by Suresh Nair. It is the remake of 2012 Tamil film Naduvula Konjam Pakkatha Kaanom. The remake stars Rahul Madhav and newcomer Aavaana.

Plot
Chandru is all set to marry his lover Nidhi Patel. Two days before the wedding, Chandru plays a leisurely cricket match with his best friends Appachan, Seetharaman  and Mani Kantan. While attempting to catch a ball, Chandru falls down and gets hit on the area of the head where the medulla oblongata is located and temporarily loses his memory of the past year. In the process, he even forgets about Nidhi and the impending marriage. After a doctor tells them that Chandru will regain his memory in two days, Appachan, Mani Kantan and Seetharaman decide not to disclose the truth to his relatives, especially to Nidhi.

Cast
 Rahul Madhav as Chandru
 Saiju Kurup as Appachan
 Rakendu as Mani Kantan
 Murali Mohan
 Nandu
 Aavaana as Nidhi Patel
 Arjun Nandakumar as Seetharaman
 Joemon Joshy as Imri
 Arun Benny

Reception
A critic from Deccan Chronicle wrote, "On the whole, debutant director Suresh Nair's low budget movie filled with endearing and engaging moments has managed to offer a wholesome entertainment that warms the cockles of your heart."

References

External links

2010s Malayalam-language films
Malayalam remakes of Tamil films